Tillandsia streptophylla is a species of flowering plant in the genus Tillandsia. This species is native to Central America, Mexico, and the West Indies (Bahamas, Cuba, Cayman Islands, Turks & Caicos Islands).

Cultivars
 Tillandsia 'Anna'
 Tillandsia 'Asombroso'
 Tillandsia 'Como'
 Tillandsia 'Curly Slim'
 Tillandsia 'Diane Wilson'
 Tillandsia 'Eric Knobloch'
 Tillandsia 'Gorgon'
 Tillandsia 'Graceful'
 Tillandsia 'Gympie'
 Tillandsia 'Hines Poth'
 Tillandsia 'Jane Williams'
 Tillandsia 'Katie Styer'- T. capitata × T. streptophylla (Steve Correale)
 Tillandsia 'Kauri'
 Tillandsia 'Litl Liz'
 Tillandsia 'Love Knot'
 Tillandsia 'Lucille'
 Tillandsia 'Paterson'
 Tillandsia 'Redy'
 Tillandsia 'Selerepton'
 Tillandsia 'Showtime'
 Tillandsia 'Sitting Pretty'
 Tillandsia 'Tall Stranger'
 Tillandsia 'Toolara'

References

streptophylla
Flora of Central America
Flora of Mexico
Flora of the Caribbean
Epiphytes
Plants described in 1836
Flora without expected TNC conservation status